Branko Baković (born 31 August 1981) is a Serbian former professional footballer who played as an attacking midfielder.

Career
After starting out at his hometown club Radnički Kragujevac, Baković was transferred to ambitious OFK Beograd in the summer of 2002. He spent the following five seasons at Stara Karaburma, scoring 20 goals in 93 league games. He also made a string of appearances in European competitions, reaching the semi-finals of the 2004 UEFA Intertoto Cup.

In 2007, Baković moved abroad to Chinese club Shandong Luneng, but failed to make an impact. He also briefly played for Romania's Politehnica Iași and Ukraine's Naftovyk-Ukrnafta Okhtyrka, before returning to his parent club Radnički Kragujevac in early 2009.

Statistics

External links
 
 
 
 

Association football midfielders
Chinese Super League players
Expatriate footballers in Bosnia and Herzegovina
Expatriate footballers in China
Expatriate footballers in Montenegro
Expatriate footballers in Romania
Expatriate footballers in Switzerland
Expatriate footballers in Ukraine
FC Naftovyk-Ukrnafta Okhtyrka players
FC Politehnica Iași (1945) players
First League of Serbia and Montenegro players
FK Radnički 1923 players
FK Slavija Sarajevo players
Liga I players
Montenegrin First League players
OFK Beograd players
OFK Grbalj players
OFK Mladenovac players
Serbia and Montenegro under-21 international footballers
Serbian expatriate footballers
Serbian expatriate sportspeople in Bosnia and Herzegovina
Serbian expatriate sportspeople in China
Serbian expatriate sportspeople in Montenegro
Serbian expatriate sportspeople in Romania
Serbian expatriate sportspeople in Switzerland
Serbian expatriate sportspeople in Ukraine
Serbian First League players
Serbian footballers
Serbian SuperLiga players
Shandong Taishan F.C. players
Sportspeople from Kragujevac
Ukrainian Premier League players
1981 births
Living people